25108 Boström, provisional designation , is a background asteroid from the central regions of the asteroid belt, approximately 7 kilometers in diameter. It was discovered on 14 September 1998, by astronomers of the Lincoln Near-Earth Asteroid Research at the Lincoln Laboratory's Experimental Test Site near Socorro, New Mexico, United States. The asteroid was named for 2008-ISEF awardee Johan Ingemar Boström.

Orbit and classification 

Boström is a non-family from the main belt's background population. It orbits the Sun in the central asteroid belt at a distance of 2.2–3.1 AU once every 4 years and 3 months (1,563 days; semi-major axis of 2.64 AU). Its orbit has an eccentricity of 0.16 and an inclination of 7° with respect to the ecliptic. The body's observation arc begins with a precovery taken by the Near-Earth Asteroid Tracking program at Haleakala Observatory's GEODSS facility in June 1997, or 9 months prior to its official discovery observation.

Physical characteristics

Diameter and albedo 

According to the survey carried out by the NEOWISE mission of NASA's Wide-field Infrared Survey Explorer, Boström measures 6.812 kilometers in diameter and its surface has an intermediate albedo of 0.115.

Rotation period 

As of 2018, no rotational lightcurve of Boström has been obtained from photometric observations. The body's rotation period, pole and shape remain unknown.

This minor planet was named after Swedish student Johan Ingemar Boström (born 1989), one of the two team members in the team project who won second place at the 2008 Intel International Science and Engineering Fair. The official naming citation was published by the Minor Planet Center on 17 September 2008.

References

External links 
 Asteroid Lightcurve Database (LCDB), query form (info )
 Dictionary of Minor Planet Names, Google books
 Asteroids and comets rotation curves, CdR – Observatoire de Genève, Raoul Behrend
 Discovery Circumstances: Numbered Minor Planets (25001)-(30000) – Minor Planet Center
 
 

025108
025108
Named minor planets
19980914